Hyleorus is a genus of flies in the family Tachinidae.

Species
Hyleorus arctornis Chao & Zhou, 1992
Hyleorus elatus (Meigen, 1838)
Hyleorus fasciatus (Curran, 1938)
Hyleorus furcatus Aldrich, 1926
Hyleorus hoyti Mesnil, 1974
Hyleorus nudinerva (Villeneuve, 1920)
Hyleorus takanoi (Mesnil, 1963)

References

Dexiinae
Tachinidae genera
Diptera of Europe
Diptera of Asia
Diptera of Australasia
Diptera of Africa
Taxa named by John Merton Aldrich